Nicki Collen (née Taggart; born May 13, 1975) is an American basketball coach and is currently the head women's basketball coach at Baylor University.

Early life
Collen was born in Indiana and her family moved to Platteville, Wisconsin when she was 10 years old.  While living in Wisconsin, Collen attended basketball camps with Bo Ryan.

Playing career
Collen began her playing career at Purdue, where she was on a team that made consecutive NCAA Tournament appearances in 1994 and 1995 and won consecutive Big 10 Championships.  During her junior year, she transferred to Marquette, where she led the team to consecutive NCAA Tournament appearances.  She earned all conference honors while at Marquette and was ranked third nationally in assists during her senior season. After her college career, Collen played one year of professional basketball in Greece with BCM Alexandros.

Coaching career
Collen began her coaching career at Colorado State as an assistant.  After her tenure there, she was an assistant at Ball State, Louisville, and Arkansas, before moving to Florida Gulf Coast.  While at Florida Gulf Coast, she helped the 2014–2015 team to a historic 31–3 record. Collen coached under Curt Miller with the Connecticut Sun after her time as a college assistant.  Collen helped the Sun turn around from a 14–20 finish in 2016 to a 21–13 record in 2017.

On October 30, 2017, Collen was announced as the head coach of the Atlanta Dream.  Collen took over for Michael Cooper after the Dream finished 12–22 in 2017.

Atlanta Dream
Collen led the Dream to a slow start; posting a 2–2 record in May and a 5–6 record in June. June was an up and down month, with the team winning on the road against the Seattle Storm, but giving the Indiana Fever their second win of the season. July saw the team find its form. The Dream posted a 9–2 record, which was tied for the best record in the league. The run moved the team from 9th in the standings to 2nd. Collen led the team on an eight-game win streak including a perfect 4–0 record on the road. For her efforts, Collen was named WNBA Coach of the Month for July. Collen was again selected WNBA Coach of the Month in August. She led the Dream to a 7–1 record, which secured them the number 2 seed in the playoffs and a bye to the Semifinals. The team's only loss was to Phoenix on the road. The team finished with a 23–11 record, a franchise best.

On August 28, 2018, it was announced that Collen was selected the WNBA Coach of the Year.  She received 37 of 39 possible votes for the award.  She is the second Dream coach to win the award.

Baylor Bears 
On May 3, 2021, Collen was hired as the head coach at Baylor following Kim Mulkey's departure to LSU.

Head coaching record

|-
| align="left" | ATL
| align="left" |2018
|34||23||11|||| align="center" | 1st in East ||5||2||3||
| align="center" | Lost in WNBA Semi-Finals
|-
| align="left" | ATL
| align="left" |2019
|34||8||26|||| align="center" | 6th in East ||—||—||—||—
| align="center" | Did Not Qualify
|-
| align="left" | ATL
| align="left" |2020
|22||7||15|||| align="center" | 4th in East ||—||—||—||—
| align="center" | Did Not Qualify
|-class="sortbottom"
| align="left" |Career
| ||90||38||52|||| ||5||2||3||

Personal life
Collen is married to basketball coach Tom Collen.  The couple have three children. The two met when Tom was an assistant at Purdue when she played there and then he later hired her as his assistant at Colorado State. They married in 2001 and she served as his assistant at Louisville and Arkansas.

External links
 Atlanta Dream Bio

References

1975 births
Living people
American women's basketball coaches
American women's basketball players
Atlanta Dream coaches
Basketball coaches from Indiana
Basketball coaches from Wisconsin
Baylor Bears women's basketball coaches
Connecticut Sun coaches
Marquette Golden Eagles women's basketball players
People from Platteville, Wisconsin
Purdue Boilermakers women's basketball players